Cogar is a small unincorporated rural community in northeast Caddo County, Oklahoma, United States. It is located approximately 10 miles west of Minco, Oklahoma on Oklahoma State Highway 37, and about 5 miles east of Salyer Lake on Oklahoma State Highway 152.  The post office was established March 25, 1902, and discontinued September 30, 1954.

References

Unincorporated communities in Caddo County, Oklahoma
Unincorporated communities in Oklahoma